Blas Camacho Zancada (1939 – 27 January 2021) was a Spanish politician who served as a Deputy (1977–1982, 1986–1993). 

He died of COVID-19 on 27 January 2021, in Madrid during the COVID-19 pandemic in Spain.

References

1939 births
2021 deaths
Spanish politicians
Deaths from the COVID-19 pandemic in Spain